Anoxia means a total depletion in the level of oxygen, an extreme form of hypoxia or "low oxygen". The terms anoxia and hypoxia are used in various contexts:

 Anoxic waters, sea water, fresh water or groundwater that are depleted of dissolved oxygen
 Anoxic event, when the Earth's oceans become completely depleted of oxygen below the surface levels
 Euxinic, anoxic conditions in the presence of hydrogen sulfide
 Hypoxia (environmental), low oxygen conditions
 Hypoxia (medical), when the body or a region of the body is deprived of adequate oxygen supply
 Cerebral anoxia, when the brain is completely deprived of oxygen, an extreme form of cerebral hypoxia

See also 
 Anoxia (beetle), a genus of scarab beetles
 Oxygen saturation, a relative measure of the oxygen dissolved or carried in a medium; a measure of the severity of hypoxic conditions
 Oxygen toxicity (hyperoxia), the opposite condition of hypoxia, an excess of oxygen in body tissues
 Oxygen-free (disambiguation)